KVCK may refer to:

 KVCK (AM), a radio station (1450 AM) licensed to Wolf Point, Montana, United States
 KVCK-FM, a radio station (92.7 FM) licensed to Wolf Point, Montana, United States